Krzysztof Wojdan (born 22 May 1968, Tarnów) is a Polish judoka. He is a 1996 Olympian. He trains UK's Grot Kraków. He competed in the men's lightweight event at the 1996 Summer Olympics.

Achievements

References

External links

1968 births
Living people
Polish male judoka
Sportspeople from Tarnów
Olympic judoka of Poland
Judoka at the 1996 Summer Olympics